The Agia Tree Monument Agiya Tree Monument is on the site once occupied by the Agia Tree (Egun: Asisoe Tin) close to the Badagry Town Hall. Significantly remarkable for being the tree under which Christianity was first preached in Nigeria by Thomas Birch Freeman and Henry Townsend on September 24, 1842, the tree lived for over 300 years until it was uprooted by a storm on June 20, 1959.

In place of the tree, an obelisk was erected in 2012 in celebration of 170 years of Christianity in Nigeria.

References

Monuments and memorials in Nigeria
2012 sculptures
1950s individual tree deaths